Vengo may refer to:

In sociology
the Vengo people
the Vengo language

In media
Vengo (film), a 2000 French film
Vengo (album), a 2014 hip-hop album by Ana Tijoux